Quwivirus is a genus of viruses in the subfamily Betaherpesvirinae, in the family Herpesviridae, in the order Herpesvirales.

Species 
The genus consists of the following three species:

 Caviid betaherpesvirus 2
 Miniopterid betaherpesvirus 1
 Tupaiid betaherpesvirus 1

References 

Betaherpesvirinae
Virus genera